James Rozon (born 31 December 1963) is a Canadian former gymnast. He competed in eight events at the 1988 Summer Olympics.

References

External links
 

1963 births
Living people
Canadian male artistic gymnasts
Olympic gymnasts of Canada
Gymnasts at the 1988 Summer Olympics
Sportspeople from Saskatoon
Pan American Games bronze medalists for Canada
Gymnasts at the 1983 Pan American Games
Pan American Games medalists in gymnastics
Medalists at the 1983 Pan American Games
20th-century Canadian people
21st-century Canadian people